Connell Patrick Rawlinson (born 22 September 1991) is a Welsh professional footballer who plays as a defender for  club Notts County.

He began his career at Chester City, making three Conference Premier appearances before the club was liquidated in March 2010. He joined The New Saints the following season, and went on to spend the next eight years with the club, winning seven Welsh Premier League titles, four Welsh Cups, and five Welsh League Cup titles. He was also named in the 2017–18 Welsh Premier League Team of the Season. He switched to the English Football League when he signed with Port Vale in May 2018. He was given a free transfer to Notts County in August 2019. He was named as County Player of the Year for the 2019–20 season, though the club lost the National League play-off final.

Early life
Rawlinson was born in Wrexham, after his mother chose that maternity hospital rather than Chester, due to the family living between the two locations.

Career

Chester City
Rawlinson began his career with Chester City, making his debut as a substitute against Oxford United at the age of 17 in 2009. He made two further Conference Premier substitute appearances in the 2009–10 season, which were officially chalked off after the club's records were expunged following their liquidation in March 2010.

The New Saints
Rawlinson joined The New Saints and made his debut in the Welsh Premier League on 29 August 2010, coming on for Phil Baker as a 61st-minute substitute in a 2–1 victory over Bala Town at Park Hall. He was handed his first start on 4 September, in a 2–1 defeat at Llanelli. He went on to play in the final of the Welsh League Cup, as TNS recorded a 4–3 victory over Llanelli on 2 May. He appeared a total of 21 times in the 2010–11 campaign and was offered professional terms at TNS for the 2011–12 season. He won a Wales semi-professional cap against Estonia in October 2011. He scored his first senior goal on 28 January, in a 4–0 victory over Newport County in the Fourth Round of the Welsh Cup. He was sent off for the first time in his career on 18 February, during a 2–1 win at Llanelli. TNS won the Welsh Premier League at the end of the 2011–12 season. Rawlinson was also an unused substitute as they won the 2012 Welsh Cup with a 2–0 victory over Cefn Druids at Nantporth.

He was loaned out to Newtown for a six-week spell in November 2012. His arrival at Latham Park allowed manager Bernard McNally to move Andy Jones from central defence to centre-forward. Rawlinson featured in five Welsh Premier League games for the "Robins", and played just six games for the "Saints" by the end of the 2012–13 season, who successfully defended their league title. One of these appearances were in the Welsh League Cup final, which ended in a penalty shoot-out defeat to Carmarthen Town following a 3–3 draw after extra-time. He scored his first goal in the Welsh Premier League on 1 April 2014, in a 3–1 home win over Newtown. He ended the 2013–14 season with 16 appearances, helping the club to again retain their league title. TNS also won the Welsh Cup, though Rawlinson was again an unused substitute during the 3−2 victory over Aberystwyth Town at the Racecourse Ground.

He made his debut in the UEFA Champions League on 15 July 2014, in a 1–0 defeat at Slovakian side ŠK Slovan Bratislava, during the Second Round of qualification. He scored four goals in 37 appearances across the 2014–15 campaign, helping TNS to a fourth consecutive league title. On 25 January, he played in a 3–0 win over Bala Town in the final of the Welsh League Cup. He also won his third Welsh Cup as TNS secured a domestic treble with a 2–0 win over Newtown at Latham Park on 2 May, though was substituted after ten minutes for Christian Seargeant. He was restricted to 19 appearances in the 2015–16 season, though TNS again won the league. He did though feature in the final of the Welsh League Cup, as TNS defeated Denbigh Town 2–0 at Maesdu Park. TNS also secured the Welsh Cup and another treble with a 2–0 victory over Airbus UK Broughton.

He re-established himself in the first-team during the 2016–17 season, scoring two goals in 40 league and cup games, as TNS clinched a sixth straight league title. TNS won the League Cup for the fourth consecutive time with a 4–0 win over Barry Town United at Cyncoed Stadium. During the season the club set a World record by winning 27 consecutive top-flight games. However they failed to retain the Welsh Cup, losing out 2–1 to Bala Town in the final. On 20 January 2018, he lifted his fifth Welsh League Cup title after helping TNS to overcome Cardiff Metropolitan University 1–0 in the final. On 2 February, he scored both TNS's goals in a 2–2 draw at Cefn Druids. Later that month he turned down the club's offer of a new contract, which was due to expire in the summer. He captained Wales C in a 3–2 defeat to England C in March 2018. He ended the 2017–18 campaign with three goals in 35 appearances, as TNS won a seventh consecutive league title. He was named in the 2017–18 Welsh Premier League Team of the Season.

Port Vale
On 23 May 2018, Rawlinson signed with Port Vale of the English Football League. He made his debut for the "Valiants" on the opening day of the 2018–19 season, a 3–0 win over Cambridge United at Vale Park on 4 August. After the game manager Neil Aspin said that "he has set his standards and proved that he can play at this level, but now he has to do it consistently". He remained one of the first names on the team sheet, though was frequently utilised at right-back rather than at his favoured spot as a centre-back. On 27 November, he scored with a "towering header" in a 3–0 win at Yeovil Town and was named on the EFL team of the week. He dropped out of the first-team picture after Aspin left the club in January and was replaced by John Askey. He was transfer-listed in May 2019, though after a good pre-season managed to force himself back into Askey's first-team plans.

Notts County
Rawlinson signed for newly-relegated National League club Notts County on 5 August 2019. He scored two goals in 40 appearances for the "Magpies" in the 2019–20 season, which was permanently suspended on 26 March due to the COVID-19 pandemic in England, with Notts County in the play-offs in third-place. County reached the play-off final at Wembley Stadium, though Rawlinson was an unused substitute as they lost the match 3–1 to Harrogate Town. Supporters voted him as Player of the Season, whilst he shared the Players' Player of the Season award with Kyle Wootton.

He played 43 games in the 2020–21 campaign, helping the club to again qualify for the play-offs, and said he was keen to extend his stay at Meadow Lane for as long as possible. Though County's defensive record was sound, new manager Ian Burchnall – who succeeded Neal Ardley in March – wanted the team to improve in front of goal, and Rawlinson admitted he needed to do more in this regard as he failed to register a goal during the campaign. Notts County reached the play-off semi-finals, where they were beaten 4–2 by Torquay United after extra time. He featured 29 times in the 2021–22 season, helping County to qualify for the play-offs with a fifth-place finish. However he was an unused substitute as they were beaten 2–1 by Grimsby Town after extra-time in the play-off quarter-finals.

Personal life
Rawlinson married 27-year-old Georgia Panton at Mold, Flintshire in July 2021 following an eight-year relationship. At the time of his wedding he had an eight-year old daughter, Amelia-Lily, from a previous relationship. He supports Everton, and family members support Wrexham.

Career statistics

Honours
Individual
Welsh Premier League Team of the Season: 2017–18
Notts County F.C. Player of the Year: 2019–20

The New Saints
Welsh Premier League: 2011–12, 2012–13, 2013–14, 2014–15, 2015–16, 2016–17, 2017–18
Welsh Cup: 2012, 2014, 2015, 2016
Welsh Cup runner-up: 2017
Welsh League Cup: 2011, 2015, 2016, 2017, 2018
Welsh League Cup runner-up: 2013

References

1991 births
Living people
Footballers from Wrexham
Welsh footballers
Wales semi-pro international footballers
Association football defenders
Chester City F.C. players
The New Saints F.C. players
Newtown A.F.C. players
Port Vale F.C. players
Notts County F.C. players
National League (English football) players
Cymru Premier players
English Football League players